Amos Eiran (עמוס ערן) is a former president of the University of Haifa in Israel.

He earned a BA in humanities from American University in Washington, DC, an MA in history from Tel Aviv University, a Diploma in Business Administration from Harvard University, and a Diploma in institutional investments from the Wharton School of the University of Pennsylvania.

Public service career
Eiran was the Director General of the Prime Minister's Office in Israel under Yitzhak Rabin. He also worked as a Counselor at the Israeli Embassy in Washington, DC. Eiran served as the Director General and Chairman of the Board of Mivtahim Pension Funds, Israel's largest pension fund, and a Director on the Boards of Bank Hapoalim and Bank Mizrachi.

From 1988 to 1990 he was President of the University of Haifa in Israel.

References 

American University alumni
Wharton School of the University of Pennsylvania alumni
Academic staff of the University of Haifa
Living people
Harvard University alumni
Tel Aviv University alumni
Presidents of universities in Israel
Year of birth missing (living people)